The Statement is a 2003 drama film directed by Norman Jewison and starring Michael Caine. It is based on the 1996 novel of the same name by Brian Moore, and the screenplay was written by Ronald Harwood. The plot was inspired by the true story of Paul Touvier, a Vichy French police official who was indicted after World War II for ordering the execution of seven Jews in retaliation for the French Resistance's assassination of Vichy France minister Philippe Henriot. For decades after the war he escaped trial thanks to an intricate web of protection, which allegedly included senior members of the Roman Catholic priesthood. He was arrested in 1989 inside a Traditionalist Catholic priory in Nice and was convicted in 1994. He died in prison in 1996, at the age of 81. The Statement is the last film directed by Jewison before his retirement.

The film was Alan Bates's final theatrical role prior to his death in the year of the film’s release.

Plot
Pierre Brossard (Caine), a French Nazi collaborator, orders seven Jews executed during World War II. Some 40 years later, he is pursued by David Manenbaum (Matt Craven), a hitman who is under orders to kill Brossard and leave a printed statement on his body proclaiming the assassination was vengeance for the Jews executed in 1944. Brossard kills Manenbaum, hiding the dead body after finding the statement and discovering that his pursuer was travelling on a Canadian passport. Brossard for years has taken refuge in sanctuaries in southern France within the Traditionalist Catholic community, appealing to long-time allies who have operated in great secrecy to shield him and provide him with funds. But now they bring increased scrutiny to themselves for continuing to do so.

The murder of Manenbaum attracts the interest of local police and eventually the persistent Investigating Judge Annemarie Livi (Tilda Swinton). She becomes absorbed by the case, not discouraged by the lack of assistance she encounters from official sectors. Livi forms an alliance with the similarly dedicated Colonel Roux (Jeremy Northam), a senior French Gendarmerie investigator, and the pair initially suspect that Manenbaum was part of a Jewish assassination plot. They discover that Brossard has been the subject of several previous investigations, dating back more than 40 years, which have all failed. Livi and Roux discover hidden resources, tightening the noose around Brossard, who finds his allies increasingly reluctant to help him.

Brossard in desperation pays a surprise visit to his estranged wife Nicole (Charlotte Rampling), a maid who is living in lower-middle-class circumstances in Marseille and is very apprehensive about seeing him again. Brossard's allies, including certain priests and a wartime colleague who has risen into a position of great power within the French government, are feeling the heat from the relentless questioning of Livi and Roux. Now desperate and unsure whom to trust, Brossard seeks new identity papers and money so he can escape France forever. On the night he is to escape, however, his handler Pochon (Ciaran Hinds) shoots him dead on orders from his former protectors within the government, who fear he will cause trouble for them if captured.

Following Brossard's death, Livi and Roux trace the conspiracy to protect him to a high-ranking government official (John Neville), and arrest him for treason.

Cast
 Michael Caine as Pierre Brossard
 Tilda Swinton as Anne-Marie Livi
 Jeremy Northam as Colonel Roux
 Alan Bates as Armand Bertier
 John Neville as The Old Man
 Charlotte Rampling as Nicole
 Ciarán Hinds as Pochon
 Frank Finlay as Commissaire Vionnet
 Matt Craven as David Manenbaum
 Noam Jenkins as Michael Levy
 Joseph Malerba as Max
 Colin Salmon as Father Patrice

Historical basis
The Statement is based on the best-selling 1995 novel of the same name by Brian Moore. In the novel and film, the fictional Brossard is based on Paul Touvier, a member of the Milice, a paramilitary police force of the Vichy French regime during World War II who ordered the execution of seven Jews in 1944. After the war, he was convicted of treason and sentenced to death in absentia, but with the aid of right-wing Roman Catholic clergymen, who provided him refuge in safe houses and monasteries, Touvier avoided capture. He received a controversial pardon from the President of France, Georges Pompidou, in 1971, but remained on the run. Unlike Brossard, Touvier was finally arrested in 1989, on a new charge of crimes against humanity; tried, convicted, and sentenced to life in prison, he died in jail in 1996, aged 81.

Reception
The film holds an approval rating of 24% on review aggregator website Rotten Tomatoes based on 106 reviews, with an average rating of 4.7/10.  The site's consensus reads: "The movie bores despite a splendid performance by Michael Caine." The film grossed a little over $765,000 domestically and $1.55 million worldwide in its limited release against a budget of $27 million.

References

External links
 

2003 films
2003 drama films
American drama films
Canadian drama films
English-language Canadian films
English-language French films
French drama films
British drama films
Films based on Canadian novels
Films set in 1992
Films about Nazi fugitives
BBC Film films
Sony Pictures Classics films
Films directed by Norman Jewison
Films scored by Normand Corbeil
Films with screenplays by Ronald Harwood
2000s American films
2000s Canadian films
2000s British films
2000s French films